St. Mary's Roman Catholic Church is a Roman Catholic church located in Port Washington, Wisconsin. Its congregation is part of the parish of St. John XIII in the Archdiocese of Milwaukee. The church was added to the National Register of Historic Places in 1977 for its architectural and religious significance.

History
The first Catholic Mass in Port Washington was read in Franz Gengler's home in 1847. In 1849 the growing parish built a tiny wooden church on "Lighthouse Hill." Since then the hill has also been called "Church Hill." In 1860 they built a larger stone church. By 1881 the parish had grown to 250 families, and they built the current church.

In 2016, St. Mary's officially merged with St. Peter of Alcantara in Port Washington and Immaculate Conception in Saukville to become St. John XXIII Parish. The traditional name of the site remains, and is now referred to as St. John XXIII Parish: St. Mary's Site.

Architecture
Henry Messmer of Milwaukee designed the new church building in Gothic Revival style, with walls of random ashlar limestone quarried three miles north of the building. A large tower is in the front center, with the main entrance at its base and a rose window above it. The square tower rises to an octagonal spire topped with various crosses. The building is decorated with wall buttresses, corbels, and corner parapets. Some parts of the exterior are trimmed in light-colored marble.

The inside is decorated with tall double lancet stained glass windows. An ornate high altar was built by E. Hackner and Son of La Crosse in 1912. The apse behind it is decorated with pastels and gold leaf.

In 1883 at the new church's dedication, a speaker described the building as "a splendid structure, an ornament not only to the city, but the entire state." Today the building, on its prominent hill, is still a focal point of the downtown.

References

Churches on the National Register of Historic Places in Wisconsin
Churches in the Roman Catholic Archdiocese of Milwaukee
Gothic Revival church buildings in Wisconsin
Religious organizations established in 1847
Roman Catholic churches completed in 1882
Churches in Ozaukee County, Wisconsin
National Register of Historic Places in Ozaukee County, Wisconsin
19th-century Roman Catholic church buildings in the United States